Miss Mauritius is a national beauty pageant held in Mauritius that selects representatives for Miss World and Miss International, two of the Big Four international beauty pageants.

History
Miss Mauritius is the oldest beauty pageant in Mauritius established in 1970 by Miss Mauritius National Organisation. The first Miss Mauritius, Florence Muller who was crowned as Miss Mauritius 1970 and participated in Miss World 1970 in London, Great Britain. The First Miss Universe Mauritius was in 1975, Nirmala Sohun.

In 1970, Sir Seewoosagar Ramgoolam, Sir Gaetan Duval et Sir Veerasamy Ringadoo, have encouraged Mrs Primerose Obeegadoo to place Mauritius on the world map for fashion & beauty. Ever since, young Mauritian ladies have represented with pride Mauritius and its quadricolor flag at Miss World, Miss International, Miss European Union, Miss Intercontinental, Top Model of the World, Miss Tourism World, Miss Africa.  
Miss Mauritius National Organisation has many preliminary contests such as Elegance Award, Talent Award, Sport Award, Beach Beauty Award, Best Dress Award, Amity Award, Photogenic Award, Marketing Award and Multimedia Award.

Titleholders

Mauritius at International pageants

Miss World Mauritius

Below is Miss World Mauritius title since 2016. Before 2016 the most of runner-ups in Miss Mauritius titled as Miss World Mauritius but some winners also selected to be at Miss World pageant. In 1975 Mauritius placed Top 15 and in 1989 placed Top 10 and awarded Miss World Africa. Began 2016 the winner of Miss Mauritius automatically competes at Miss World.

Miss International Mauritius

The second winner of Miss Mauritius will be competing at Miss International pageant.

References

Beauty pageants in Mauritius
Recurring events established in 1970
1970 establishments in Mauritius
Mauritian awards
Mauritius